The "Jumpman" logo is owned by Nike to promote the Air Jordan brand of basketball sneakers and other sportswear. It is the silhouette of former NBA player and current Charlotte Hornets owner Michael Jordan.

In October 2015, Michael Jordan opened his first exclusive Jumpman flagship store in Chicago on State Street.

Lawsuit 
On January 22, 2015, photographer Jonas Linder sued Nike, claiming copyright infringement over the use of the Jumpman logo. According to Rentmeester, Nike copied a photograph for which he had granted them temporary permission to use for the logo. The suit was brought to a federal court in Portland, Oregon, for an unspecified amount. The suit was dismissed in June of that year.

Overseas copyright battle 
There are a lot of companies that want to profit off of the success of the Jordan brand. They do that by creating a rendition of the logo that may have a slight adjustment. The Chinese company Qiaodan (meaning "Jordan" in Chinese) Sports was one of them. Founded in 2000, Qiaodan Sports soon registered several kinds of trademarks that related to Jordan, including the current name of the company with Chinese characters and pinyin along with the logo of a silhouetted basketball player. Taking advantage of the fact that international trademarks are not protected if they are not registered in mainland China due to the first-to-file policy, Qiaodan Sports had been exceptionally fruitful in the Chinese market utilizing the fame of Michael Jordan. In 2012 Jordan sued Qiaodan Sports for using the Jumpman logo to sell their products and even selling the shoes under his name because the name of the company in Mandarin is Jordan. This mislead customers to believing that they were buying products from Jordan himself, but in all reality it wasn't his shoe. Jordan would lose the legal battle because "the image of the disputed trademark is a human body in a shadowy design, which does not clearly reflect the major appearances of the figure. It is hard for the relevant public to recognize the image as Michael Jordan." 

In July 2017, Qiaodan Sports filed a lawsuit against Michael Jordan for infringement of reputation and demanded 1.1 million yuan (US$162,500) in compensation. In the filing, Qiaodan claimed that Jordan had "maliciously" initiated 78 trademarks disputes over a number of years but had only managed to win three of them. On April 8, 2020, after eight years of Chinese trademark battle, Jordan finally prevailed over Qiaodan Sports at the China People's Supreme Court, resulting in revocation of 74 trademarks for Qiaodan Sports.The People's Supreme Court explained that "natural persons have the right to their name in accordance with the law. Unauthorized registration of a name as a trademark may easily mislead the relevant public to believing that the goods or services marked with the trademark have a specific endorsement, permission, etc. This violates the provisions of Article 31 of the Trademark Law." Jordan also claimed for portrait right against Qiaodan Sports' logo. However, prosecutors claimed that "the Qiaodan's logo did not violate Jordan's portraiture rights as it does not include distinguishable facial features." Even after this case the Jordan brand continues to battle cases with other companies copying the Jordan Jumpman logo. Jordan was only able to win a partial part of the lawsuit.

Athletic program sponsorships 

The Michigan Wolverines announced in July 2015 that it would switch from sponsorship by Adidas to Nike. The deal at the time had an estimated value of $169 million and was described as "the richest apparel deal in intercollegiate athletics". In April 2016, the University announced the signing of an 11-year, $127.12 million contract for 31 Michigan sports teams, going into effect on August 1. With the agreement, Michigan Wolverines football became the first football program to wear Jordan Brand attire accompanied by the jumpman logo. Within a year, several other athletics programs signed even larger deals with Nike.

Other large football programs started to wear the Jumpman logo after Michigan. In 2017, the University of North Carolina announced that their football program will be wearing uniforms with Jordan Jumpman logo. The Tar Heels also wear the Jordan Jumpman logo on their helmets. The University of Oklahoma was the third football program that became sponsor by the Jordan brand. The football, men's basketball and women's basketball team will be wearing the Jumpman logo starting in the 2018–19 season. On December 6, 2017, the University of Florida announced that the Florida Gators football program would join the three other universities in using the Jordan brand and Jumpman logo for its athletic gear.

Nike became the official supplier of all National Basketball Association (NBA) uniforms beginning with the 2017–18 season, and these jerseys have the Nike logo. Owing to Jordan's association with and ownership of the team, the Charlotte Hornets' jerseys have the Jumpman logo instead of the Nike logo.

In April 2018 the University of Houston Cougars basketball program announced that they would become the seventh college basketball program to wear the Jumpman logo.

In December 2020 the UCLA Bruins basketball program and football team became bearers of the Nike Jumpman logo. UCLA men's basketball has more NCAA national championships (11) than any other college program. No monetary amount was announced for the six-year deal.

French association football team Paris Saint-Germain, whose apparel is supplied by Nike, added the Jumpman logo to their 2018–19 UEFA Champions League kits.

Since 2011 the Air Jordan brand has sponsored Monster Energy NASCAR Cup Series driver Denny Hamlin, They also have made all of Hamlin's firesuits since 2011. In 2013 the company they were the primary sponsor of his No. 51 Kyle Busch Motorsports Toyota Tundra at Martinsville where he would win the pole but ultimately would end up finishing 6th.

In March 2022, the Ateneo Blue Eagles, whose jerseys is supplied by Nike since 2002, had replaced the iconic Nike "swoosh" logo with the Jumpman logo to its jerseys in the basketball program of the University beginning in the 84th season of the UAAP, becoming the first collegiate team outside of North America to bear the Jumpman logo.

In popular culture 
The song "Jumpman" by Drake and Future takes its name from the Jumpman logo and mentions the brand multiple times in its lyrics.

Buckethead's composition "Jordan" references the Jumpman logo in the single cover, and the name of the song references Michael Jordan.

References 

Nike brands
Cultural depictions of Michael Jordan
Commercial logos
Symbols introduced in 1988